Gustaf Munthe may refer to:

 Gustaf Munthe (1809–1889), Swedish public servant, county governor in Västerbotten County
 Gustaf Munthe (1849–1919), Swedish public servant, president of the Legal, Financial and Administrative Services Agency
 Gustaf Munthe (1896–1962), Swedish writer, art historian and art teacher